In computational complexity theory the Blum axioms or Blum complexity axioms are axioms  that specify desirable properties of complexity measures on the set of computable functions. The axioms were first defined by Manuel Blum in 1967.

Importantly, Blum's speedup theorem and the Gap theorem hold for any complexity measure satisfying these axioms. The most well-known measures satisfying these axioms are those of time (i.e., running time) and space (i.e., memory usage).

Definitions 

A Blum complexity measure is a pair  with  a numbering of the partial computable functions  and a computable function

which satisfies the following Blum axioms.
 the set  is recursive.

Examples 

   is a complexity measure, if  is either the time or the memory (or some suitable combination thereof) required for the computation coded by i.
   is not a complexity measure, since it fails the second axiom.

Complexity classes 

For a total computable function  complexity classes of computable functions can be defined as

If we consider those functions as indicator functions on sets,  can be thought of as a complexity class of sets.

References 

Structural complexity theory
Mathematical axioms